James Diament Westcott, III (May 1, 1838 or June 18, 1838 – April 29, 1887), also known as James Diament Westcott, Jr., was an American politician from the state of Florida who served as the 19th Justice of the Florida Supreme Court.

Early life and education 
Westcott was born in the city of Tallahassee in the Florida Territory on either May 1, 1838 or June 18, 1838. Westcott is the son of James Westcott, an early Florida politician who would later serve as its U.S. Senator. Although Westcott is the third in his family to share the name, he used the  "Jr." suffix rather than the "III" suffix throughout his life.

Westcott studied at the West Florida Seminary.

Political career 
In 1858, Westcott became the Assistant Secretary of the Florida Senate. The following year, he became the private secretary of Governor Madison S. Perry.

During the American Civil War, served as an officer in the Confederate States Army, serving in the 1st Florida Infantry under the command of Brigadier General James Patton Anderson. Westcott served as Anderson's Commissary General and attained the rank of Captain. After his retirement from the Confederate States Army in 1864, Westcott served as the clerk of the C.S. District Court for Florida.

After the end of the war, Westcott was elected to the Florida House of Representatives, representing Leon County, in 1866, though he would resign later that year. In the 1868 elections, Westcott, a Democrat, successfully ran for Florida Attorney General. This is despite the fact that both the 1868 Presidential election and 1868 Florida Governor election were both landslides for the Republican Party as a result of the 1868 Florida Constitution enfranchising freedmen, who mostly registered as Republicans. Additionally, many former Confederates, mostly Democrats, were still disenfranchised as part of Reconstruction.

Florida Supreme Court 
Within a few weeks of assuming office as Attorney General in July 1868, Westcott was appointed to the Florida Supreme Court by Republican Governor Harrison Reed, making him the youngest justice in the Court's history.

Despite their political differences, Reed saw potential in appointing Westcott to the Supreme Court. For one, it was important for Reed to appease the Southern Democrats by appointing one of their own to the Court, as it was filled with carpetbagger Republicans. Additionally, Westcott's friendly disposition on the one hand and thoroughness in researching the law and precedent on the other made in invaluable to the Court, and earned him respect from members of both parties. During his time on the Court, Westcott wrote 267 decisions, more than any other Justice up to that time except for Chief Justice Edwin M. Randall.

In 1872, incumbent Republican U.S. Senator Thomas W. Osborn did not run for re-election. Westcott ran to succeed him, receiving the Democratic nomination. However, Westcott lost in the general election to Republican Simon B. Conover as a result of the continuing Republican wave during Reconstruction.

Westcott continued to serve on the Florida Supreme Court until illness forced him to resign in 1885.

Death and legacy 
Westcott died in Tallahassee, Florida on April 19, 1887 from the same illness that forced him to resign just two years earlier. Westcott is buried in Tallahassee's Old City Cemetery.

Westcott, a lifelong bachelor, left his entire estate to his Alma mater, the West Florida Seminary, which was struggling at the time. In part thanks to his contribution, the college survived to become Florida State University. In December 1936, Florida State University renamed the Administration Building to the James D. Westcott Jr. Memorial Building.

See also
James Westcott
Westcott Building

Notes

References

1839 births
1887 deaths
People from Tallahassee, Florida
Justices of the Florida Supreme Court
Democratic Party members of the Florida House of Representatives
Florida Attorneys General
Florida State University
Florida State University alumni
Confederate States Army officers
Confederate States Army soldiers
19th-century American politicians
People of Florida in the American Civil War
19th-century American judges